is an international airport located  west southwest of Komatsu Station in the city of Komatsu, Ishikawa Prefecture, Japan. It is the largest airport in the Hokuriku region and serves the southern portion of Ishikawa Prefecture including the capital of Kanazawa (which has its IATA city code QKW), as well as Fukui and the northern portion of Fukui Prefecture.

The Japan Air Self-Defense Force Komatsu Base (小松基地 Komatsu Kichi) shares the runway with civil aviation; the inland-side taxiway is used by the JASDF and the sea-side one is used by civilian flights.  The base hosts a Kōkū-sai (Air Festival) every September, featuring demo flights by fighter and rescue aircraft as well as the Blue Impulse acrobat flight team.  It often hosts technical competitions of the JASDF. The "Airspace G" is a large training airspace over the Sea of Japan to the north of the base.

The airport has a single passenger terminal building serving domestic and international flights. Its international cargo terminal, known as HIACT (Hokuriku International Air Cargo Terminal), is owned by a consortium of government and corporate entities and aims to serve as an international distribution center for cargo from Europe and other continents. Its runway surface has been upgraded to enable non-stop freighter flights to and from Europe and North America in late 2006.

History

The airport was originally a base of the Imperial Japanese Navy during World War II. The United States Armed Forces took over the base at the end of the war in 1945 and used the site as a radar facility. The airport saw irregular service to Osaka and Nagoya starting in 1955.

The base was handed over to the Japan Air Self-Defense Force in 1958 and designated as a jet fighter base in 1960. Komatsu Base was formally inaugurated in 1961. Scheduled service to Osaka and Nagoya began in 1962, using Douglas DC-3 aircraft, followed by Fokker F.27 service to Tokyo in 1963. The airport's first international service was a charter flight from Hong Kong in 1973.

Ishikawa Prefecture set aside funds for an airport promotion committee in 2012 amid expectations that the opening of the Hokuriku Shinkansen in 2015 would impact traffic on the Komatsu-Tokyo route.

Designated as a shared airport for defense and civil.
1973 Jet service began with Boeing 737s.
1979 International scheduled service to Seoul began.
1980 B747s were introduced to Komatsu Airport, for flights to Tokyo
1981 The new domestic terminal complete.
1984 The new international terminal complete.
1994 HIACT（International Cargo Building）complete. Designated as a Free Access Zone.
1994 Cargolux began international scheduled freight service between Luxembourg.
2002 The new HIACT termial complete.
2004 The new control tower began operations.
2005 The temporary runway began operation.
2006 Upgrading of the permanent runway complete. Operations switched to the permanent runway.
2007 USAF F-15C, C-17 came for JASDF joint training.
2007 A new domestic cargo building opens.

Statistics

Airlines and destinations

Passenger

Cargo

JASDF units 
Komatsu is the only fighter base on the Sea of Japan coast. The following JASDF units are stationed at Komatsu: 
 6th Air Wing (第6航空団) 
 303rd Tactical Fighter Squadron (Mitsubishi F-15J/DJ)(Kawasaki T-4)
306th Tactical Fighter Squadron (Mitsubishi F-15J/DJ)(Kawasaki T-4)
 Tactical Fighter Training Group
 Central Air Civil Engineering Group, 2nd Squadron (中部航空施設隊第２作業隊)
 Komatsu Air Rescue Squadron (小松救難隊) – UH-60J and U-125A aircraft
 Komatsu Air Traffic Control Squadron (小松管制隊)
 Komatsu Weather Squadron (小松気象隊)
 Komatsu Regional Air Police Squadron (小松地方警務隊) – responsible for criminal investigations of JASDF personnel in Ishikawa Prefecture, Toyama Prefecture and Fukui Prefecture

Other facilities 
Komatsu Airport Office, Ōsaka Air Transportation Bureau.
Komatsu Office, Air Transportation Security Association.
Fire and Disaster Mitigation Office, Ishikawa Prefectural Government.
Equipped with Bell 412EP fire and disaster mitigation helicopter "Hakusan".
Komatsu Operations Office, Nakanihon Air Service
A helicopter is based here.

Access

The airport is located near the Hokuriku Expressway. Scheduled bus service is available to Kanazawa Station (40 minutes), Komatsu Station (15 minutes) and Fukui Station (1 hour).

References

External links

Komatsu Airport
 Hokuriku International AirCargo Terminal
 JASDF Komatsu Base
 Komatsu Airport Guide from Japan Airlines

Airports in Japan
Airports established in 1944
1944 establishments in Japan
Japan Air Self-Defense Force bases
Transport in Ishikawa Prefecture
Buildings and structures in Ishikawa Prefecture
Komatsu, Ishikawa